American Japanese may refer to:

 Americans in Japan, residents of Japan from the US
 Dekasegi, migrant workers in Japan originating from various countries of the Americas
 Japanese Americans, US citizens of Japanese descent
 Japanese language education in the United States, education of Japanese American children, non-Japanese or native speakers of Japanese
 Japan–United States relations, the relations between the US and Japan

See also
 Afro-Asians, people of mixed black and Asian descent
 Amerasian, a person born in Asia to an Asian mother and a U.S. military father
 Demographics of North America, diverse language, economy and ethnicity in North America
 Eurasian (mixed ancestry), people of mixed European and Asian ancestry
 Hapa, a person of mixed ethnic heritage
 Japanese people, an ethnic group native to Japan
 :es:Café El Japonés, for discussion of early Japanese migration to Argentina